John T. Galligan (1865–1937) was an American professional baseball player who played for the 1889 Louisville Colonels.

External links

Baseball players from Pennsylvania
Louisville Colonels players
1865 births
1937 deaths
19th-century baseball players
Allentown Dukes players
Richmond Virginians (minor league) players
Buffalo Bisons (minor league) players
Scranton Miners players
Wilmington Blue Hens players